Oreta fuscopurpurea is a species of moth of the family Drepanidae. It is found in Taiwan, China (Zhejiang, Hubei, Jiangxi, Hunan, Fujian, Guangdong, Hainan, Guangxi, Sichuan, Chongqing) and Japan.

The wingspan is 35–43 mm. Adults are on wing in January.

References

Moths described in 1956
Drepaninae
Moths of Japan